Tiger Tiger may refer to:

Arts and entertainment

Literature
 "The Tyger", a 1794 poem by William Blake, which opens with "Tyger Tyger"
 "Tiger! Tiger!" (Kipling short story), an 1893/1894 Mowgli story by Rudyard Kipling
 Tiger! Tiger!, original title of the Alfred Bester novel The Stars My Destination
 "Tiger! Tiger!", a 2003 short story by Elizabeth Bear in Shadows Over Baker Street
 Tiger, Tiger! Princeton in Caricature by William F. Brown (writer)
Tiger, Tiger: A Memoir, 2011 autobiography by Margaux Fragoso

Music
 "Tiger Tiger", a song by Duran Duran from the 1983 album Seven and the Ragged Tiger
 "Tiger! Tiger!", a song by Slough Feg from the 2008 album Hardworlder.
 "Tiger, Tiger", a song from the musical The Apple Tree

Other uses
 Tiger Tiger (nightclub), a British nightclub chain
 An alternative name for tiger tail ice cream, a Canadian orange-flavoured ice cream with black liquorice swirl

See also 
 Tiger (disambiguation)
Tora! Tora! Tora!
 Tyger Tiger, or Jessan Hoan, a Marvel Comics book character